King Cove Airport  is a state-owned public-use airport located four miles (6 km) northeast of the central business district of King Cove, a city in the Aleutians East Borough of the U.S. state of Alaska.

Facilities and aircraft 
King Cove Airport has one runway (7/25) with a gravel surface measuring 3,500 x 75 ft. (1,067 x 23 m). For the 12-month period ending December 31, 2005, the airport had 1,030 aircraft operations: 71% air taxi and 29% general aviation.

Airlines and destinations

References

External links 
 FAA Alaska airport diagram (GIF)
 Resources for this seaplane base:
 
 
 

Airports in Aleutians East Borough, Alaska